The 34th South American Junior Championships in Athletics were held at the Estádio Olímpico do Pará  in Belém, Brazil from August 1–3,
2002 in conjunction with the 7th South American (ODESUR) Games.  Athletes from the Netherlands Antilles competed solely for the South American Games, and were considered as guests for the South American Junior Championships.

Medal summary

Medal winners are published for men and women
Complete results can be found on the "World Junior Athletics History" website.

Men

Women

Doping

Eliane Pereira from Brazil was tested positive for Stanozolol, an
anabolic steroid. Consequently, she lost her gold medal in 1,500 m (in
4:33.19) and her silver medal in 3,000 m (in 9:52.42), and was banned for two
years.

Two further cases with enhanced Testosterone/Epitestosterone ratio were discovered (no
medalists involved).

Medal table (unofficial)

Final scoring per countries

Participation (unofficial)

Detailed result lists can be found on the "World Junior Athletics History" website.  An unofficial count yields the number of about 194 athletes (plus an unknown number of guest athletes from the Netherlands Antilles) from about 10 countries:

 (22)
 (7)
 (69)
 (29)
 (19)
 (4)
 (3)
 Perú (8)
 (3)
 (30)
Guest Nation:
 (unknown)

References

External links
World Junior Athletics History

South American U20 Championships in Athletics
South American Junior Championships in Athletics
South American Junior Championships in Athletics
International athletics competitions hosted by Brazil
South American Junior Championships in Athletics